Joash Abong'o Onyango (born 31 January 1993) is a Kenyan professional footballer who plays as a defender for Tanzanian Premier League side Simba S.C. and the Kenya national football team.

International career
Onyango made his debut for Kenya on 25 May 2018 against Swaziland.
Onyango was named in the Kenya national football team as top defenders to play in 2019 Africa Cup of Nations in Egypt but did not participate due to knee injury. Before then during the U17 team tournaments, he played Centre Midfield and was nicknamed 'Deco' after Portuguese footballer Deco.

Career statistics

International
Statistics accurate as of match played 11 September 2018

Honours 
Kenyan Premier League: winner (2017, 2018)

References

External links
 

1993 births
Living people
Kenyan footballers
Kenya international footballers
Association football defenders
Western Stima F.C. players
Gor Mahia F.C. players
Kenyan Premier League players
People from Uasin Gishu County